Damned River is a 1989 American action film directed by Michael Schroeder and co-written by John Crowther and Bayard Johnson. The film stars Stephen Shellen, Lisa Aliff, John Terlesky, Marc Poppel, Bradford Bancroft and Louis van Niekerk. The film was released on October 13, 1989, by United Artists.

Plot

Cast 
Stephen Shellen as Ray
Lisa Aliff as Anne
John Terlesky as Carl
Marc Poppel as Luke
Bradford Bancroft as Jerry
Louis van Niekerk as Von Hoenigen
Leslie Mongezi as Mavuso
Moses Ncube as Young Boy
Mtcheso Ncube as Witchdoctor 
Todd Brownell as Von Hoenigen's Man
Joe Siabe as Von Hoenigen's Man
Tetrex Tshuma as Von Hoenigen's Man
Boniface Chivuvenga as Von Hoenigen's Man

References

External links 
 

1989 films
1980s English-language films
United Artists films
American action films
1989 action films
Whitewater films
Films directed by Michael Schroeder
1980s American films